Neffe means nephew in German. It is a German surname that may refer to
Jürgen Neffe (born 1956), German writer 
Karel Neffe (born 1948), Czech rower 
Karel Neffe Jr. (born 1985), Czech rower

See also
 Frankie & Neffe, an American TV series
Neffes

German-language surnames